Renos Haralambidis (born 14 October 1970) is a Greek actor, screenwriter and film director. As an actor, he appeared in more than fifty films since 1994.

Selected filmography

References

External links 

1970 births
Living people
Greek male film actors
Male actors from Athens